Mare Vitalis (Latin for "Sea of Life") is the second full-length album by Lawrence, Kansas-based emo group The Appleseed Cast. It was released on Deep Elm Records in 2000.

Critical reception
Exclaim! called "Storms" "a brooding, seven-and-half minute emo classic." Willamette Week called Mare Vitalis the band's "most essential album," writing that "[singer-guitarist Chris] Crisci and guitarist Aaron Pillar split the difference between their post-rock future and the driving punk that birthed the band." The Chicago Reader thought that "on 'And Nothing Less' and 'Santa Maria' the Appleseed Cast find nirvana through repetition." Vulture deemed it "oceanic indie rock."

Track listing
"The Immortal Soul of Mundo Cani" – 2:10
"Fishing the Sky" – 3:59
"Forever Longing the Golden Sunsets" – 4:42
"Mare Mortis" – 3:29
"Santa Maria" – 3:36
"Secret" – 4:35
"...And Nothing Less" – 4:51
"Poseidon" – 4:10
"Kilgore Trout" – 2:53
"Storms" – 7:36
"Bonus Track" – 12:16 (vinyl)

References

External links
Mare Vitalis at Deep Elm Records

2000 albums
The Appleseed Cast albums
Albums produced by Ed Rose